Kantilal Thakoredas Desai (1 May 1903 - 29 January 1977) was the second Chief Justice at the High Court of Gujarat whose term in office was from January 1961 till May 1963.

Career
Desai studied at Bombay. He enrolled as an Advocate at the High Court of Bombay in 1930. His specialization was in commercial law. He was brought to the Bench of the court in 1957. When the state of Bombay was bifurcated in 1960, Desai was appointed a Judge at the new Gujarat High Court.

Legacy
The Bombay High Court holds an annual "Justice K. T. Desai Memorial Lecture" in his honour. Previous speakers in this series include Ruma Pal, Ashok Desai (2013), Ramesh Chandra Lahoti (2014), Anthony Lester, Baron Lester of Herne Hill (2015) and Rohinton Fali Nariman (2016). Sujata Manohar, formerly a judge at the Supreme Court of India, is his daughter.

References

1903 births
1977 deaths
20th-century Indian judges
20th-century Indian lawyers
Chief Justices of the Gujarat High Court
Judges of the Bombay High Court